The Shadowthrone is the second studio album by the Norwegian black metal band Satyricon. It was released on September 12, 1994, by Moonfog Productions. A newly remastered version was released on May 28, 2021 with different artwork.

Style
The band has described The Shadowthrone as "an atmospheric and symphonic album with a strong Nordic touch. There are fewer acoustic guitars and medieval influences, and it is harsher and grimmer than the debut Dark Medieval Times, but it still maintains the atmosphere set forth in their debut album."

Track listing

Personnel
 Satyricon
 Satyr (Sigurd Wongraven) – vocals, guitar, keyboards on "I en svart kiste", album photos, logos and design, production
 Frost (Kjetil-Vidar Haraldstad) – drums, album logos
 Samoth (Tomas Thormodsæter Haugen) – bass guitar, guitar

Session
 S. S. (Steinar Sverd Johnsen) – keyboards, piano

Production
 B. E. L. – sleeve photos
 K. Moen – engineering
 Vofagem – sleeve design

Charts

References

Satyricon (band) albums
1994 albums